Kokrek is a rural locality (a улица шамиля) in the Khasavyurtovsky District in the Republic of Dagestan, Russia. Population:

References

Rural localities in Khasavyurtovsky District